Martins River  is a community in the Canadian province of Nova Scotia, located in the Lunenburg Municipal District in Lunenburg County. It takes its name from the river which flows through the community. A section of the Trans Canada Trail passes through the community on the former alignment of the Halifax and Southwestern Railway.

References
Martin's River on Destination Nova Scotia
Military Engineers Trans Canada Trail Foundation Martins River Bridge

Communities in Lunenburg County, Nova Scotia
General Service Areas in Nova Scotia